Balan-Bihul is a rural municipality in Saptari District in Province No. 2 of south-eastern Nepal. At the time of the 2017 Nepal census it had a population of 26,068 people living in 6,560 individual households. There are six village development committees (wards) malhaniya, belhi, mauwha, sehra, madirwala tol etc. lies under this gaupalika. 
)

References 

Rural municipalities of Nepal established in 2017
Populated places in Saptari District
Rural municipalities in Madhesh Province